Khalida Toumi (born 13 March 1958), aka Khalida Messaoudi, is an Algerian politician. She was the  Minister of Communication and Culture until April 2014. She is also a feminist activist. In 2022, she was convicted of corruption and sentenced to six years in prison.

Biography
Khalida Toumi was known as Khalida Messaoudi before she reclaimed her maiden name. She was born in 1958 in Ain-Bessem, Bouira, in the north of Algeria and entered the University of Algiers in 1977 to pursue a degree in mathematics. After graduating from the École Normale Supérieure, she taught mathematics until 1993.

As a feminist activist, in 1981, she founded the Collectif féminin (Women's Grouping) not only to oppose the ministerial interdiction on Algerian women leaving the country unless accompanied by a male family member, but also to oppose state endorsement of the discriminatory Algerian Family Code, which the National Assembly eventually adopted in 1984. Following the adoption of this code, Toumi presided over the Association for Equality between Men and Women, founded by a group of Trotskyite militants. In 1985, Toumi co-founded and became a member of the executive committee of the Algerian League of Human Rights. She later distanced herself from the Trotskyite militants and in 1990 founded the Independent Association for the Triumph of Women's Rights.

Toumi staunchly opposed Islamist ideology and endorsed cancellation of the January 1992 legislative elections, which the Islamic Salvation Front (FIS) was poised to win. She considered the FIS to display "absolutely all the classic ingredients of totalitarian populist movements." She traveled to Western countries to provide an anti-Islamist and anti-terrorist perspective.

A member of the Rassemblement pour la Culture et la Démocratie (RCD), she won a seat in the National Assembly and served as the RCD's national vice president for human rights and women's issues. After profound disagreements with the RCD's president Saïd Sadi, she severed relations with the RCD in January 2001, at the peak of the crisis in her native Kabylie; she was subsequently expelled from the RCD. In May 2002, she became minister of culture and communication, as well as the government's spokesperson, the first woman ever to hold that job. She held that ministerial post in various terms until 2014.

Professional experience
1984-1991 Teacher of mathematics
1992-1993 Member of the (CCN): Conseil consultatif national.
1997-2002 Deputy of Algiers at the People's National Assembly (l’Assemblée populaire nationale).
2000-2001 Vice-president of the (CNRSE) Commission nationale de réforme du système éducatif.

Political activities

May 1985 founding member and president of the first Association of Independent Women.
March 1985 founding member and Vice-president of the first Algerian League of Human Rights
January 1992 Member of the CNSA and of the CCN
April 1996 – 2001 Member of the secularist party: the RCD, excluded in July 2001
1997-2002 Deputy of Algiers at the (APN) under the RCD label
October 1993 Vice president of Mouvement pour la République (MPR)
9 May 2003 Algerian Minister of Communication and Culture

See also
Cabinet of Algeria

References

External links
Khalida Messaoudi

1958 births
Living people
Algerian activists
Algerian feminists
Algerian Berber feminists
Culture ministers of Algeria
Kabyle people
National Liberation Front (Algeria) politicians
People of the 2010–2012 Algerian protests
Women government ministers of Algeria
21st-century Algerian women politicians
21st-century Algerian politicians
20th-century Algerian women politicians
20th-century Algerian politicians